Delos Marshall "Toby" Cosgrove (born 1940) is an American Vietnam War veteran and former heart surgeon. He served as the president and chief executive of the Cleveland Clinic from 2004 until 2017.

Early life
Toby Cosgrove was born in 1940 in Watertown, New York and graduated from Williams College, where he majored in history. He received an MD from the University of Virginia School of Medicine. He was an intern at the Massachusetts General Hospital, the Boston Children’s Hospital, and Brook General Hospital in London, U.K.

Career
During the Vietnam War, Cosgrove served as a surgeon in the United States Air Force. He was awarded the Bronze Star Medal for his service.

Cosgrove began working at the Cleveland Clinic in 1975. By 1989, he was appointed as the chairman of its Department of Thoracic and Cardiovascular Surgery. He served as its president and chief executive from 2004 to 2017.

Cosgrove practiced thoracic surgery until 2006. During the course of his career, he performed over 22,000 procedures. He served as the president of the American Association of Thoracic Surgery in 2000. He is a member of the Society of Thoracic Surgeons, the American College of Surgeons, and the American Heart Association. He also became a member of the Institute of Medicine in 2013.

Cosgrove was offered the position of Secretary of the United States Department of Veterans Affairs by President Barack Obama in 2014, but he turned it down. He was interviewed for the same position by president-elect Donald Trump in December 2016.

In December 2016, Cosgrove joined a business forum assembled by president-elect Donald Trump to provide strategic and policy advice on economic issues.

Personal life
Cosgrove has a wife, Anita. He is dyslexic.

Works

References

1940 births
Living people
American health care chief executives
United States Air Force personnel of the Vietnam War
American cardiac surgeons
Cleveland Clinic people
People with dyslexia
University of Virginia School of Medicine alumni
United States Air Force officers
Williams College alumni
Members of the National Academy of Medicine